TheFutureEmbrace is the debut solo album by American musician Billy Corgan, frontman of the alternative rock band The Smashing Pumpkins. Released in June 2005, the album's sound was markedly different from most of Corgan's earlier work, eschewing his characteristic "drums, bass, (and) big-guitars sound" in favor of an electronic sound punctuated with heavily distorted guitar parts reminiscent of shoegaze.

Background and production 
After the dissolution of Zwan in late 2003, Corgan set to work on a solo album of songs based on the history of his hometown, Chicago. This project was shelved and Corgan began work on TheFutureEmbrace in late 2004 in his Chicago studio, Pumpkinland. Rather than repeat the sonic territory of his earlier bands, Corgan decided on an electronic sound with shoegaze influences. Regarding the atypical sound of the album, Corgan remarked,

The sound of the album is almost entirely synthesized, with the exception of Corgan's voice and guitar playing. Corgan has an extensive collection of vintage analog synthesizers and drum machines that were employed on the album. The synths were largely programmed by Bon Harris of Nitzer Ebb.

Arrangements on the album followed an unusual process: for each song, Corgan would write the basic structure, and the song's melody was then split into four sections based on the bass, tenor, alto, and soprano voicings of the chord structure. The production team – Corgan, Harris, producer Bjorn Thorsrud, and programmers Matt Walker and Brian Liesegang – would then program different synth melodies in each voicing, and combine them into a multitrack recording. Drums were added, mostly from pre-1985 drum machines. At this point, Corgan would rework vocal parts and record vocals, as well as recording his guitar part. Each song contains a single take of guitar, in stark contrast to the Boston-style multitracking employed on Smashing Pumpkins albums. Despite the challenge of this approach, it was employed for all album tracks as well as an additional 8 outtakes.

The album features backing vocals and a guitar solo by The Cure frontman Robert Smith on a cover of the Bee Gees' song "To Love Somebody", while "DIA" features electronic drums played by Corgan's longtime collaborator, drummer Jimmy Chamberlin, as well as the violin and backing voice of Emilie Autumn.

Promotion 
In the lead-up to the album, Corgan generated considerable attention when he started publishing an autobiography, The Confessions of Billy Corgan, on his website, piece-by-piece. The postings are notable for Corgan's candor regarding his family, personal relationships, and activity during different eras of The Smashing Pumpkins. Corgan updated the Confessions on a frequent basis, but after posting an entry titled "Following the Moon (1974)" on July 1, 2005, the entries stopped.

The album was preceded by the release of a single and music video release of "Walking Shade". Corgan, with his touring band, performed "Mina Loy (M.O.H.)" on Late Show with David Letterman the day before the album's release. Corgan also appeared on The Tonight Show with Jay Leno, and played "To Love Somebody."

Those who pre-ordered the album from the iTunes store received a bonus track from the TheFutureEmbrace recording sessions, "Tilt". "Tilt" was also included on the Target retail stores exclusive release, Red Room Vol. 4.

Release and aftermath 

TheFutureEmbrace was released on June 21, 2005. On the day of its release, Corgan took out an ad and wrote that the album "picks up the thread of the as-yet-unfinished work and charter of The Smashing Pumpkins", and also announced plans to reform that band.

TheFutureEmbrace received a mixed response from critics. Jim DeRogatis of the Chicago Sun-Times said the album represented Corgan's "most distinctive and consistent music." Performing well below Smashing Pumpkins releases, it charted at number 89 in the UK and peaked at number 31 in the United States. As of February 2006, the album's domestic sales were a mere 69,000 units sold.

Billy Corgan, with Matt Walker, Brian Liesegang and Linda Strawberry, embarked on an international club tour in support of the album in the summer of 2005. Beginning in 2015, TheFutureEmbrace songs began appearing in Smashing Pumpkins concert sets.

Track listing
All songs written by Billy Corgan, except as noted.

 "All Things Change" – 3:59
 "Mina Loy (M.O.H.)" – 3:53
 "The CameraEye" – 3:04
 "ToLoveSomebody" (Barry Gibb/Robin Gibb) – 4:00
 "A100" (Billy Corgan/Bon Harris) – 4:23
 "DIA" – 4:20
 "Now (And Then)" – 4:43
 "I'm Ready" – 3:44
 "Walking Shade" – 3:14
 "Sorrows (In Blue)" – 2:48
 "Pretty, Pretty Star" – 3:46
 "Strayz" – 3:31
Bonus track
"Tilt" (iTunes exclusive)

Personnel
 Billy Corgan – vocals, guitar, drum machine, synth, programming, production, mixing
 Bon Harris – programming, production
 Brian Liesegang – additional programming
 Bjorn Thorsrud – production, mixing, engineering
 Matt Walker – additional programming

Guest musicians
 Emilie Autumn – vocals and violin on "DIA"
 Jimmy Chamberlin – drums on "DIA"
 Robert Smith – vocals and guitar on "ToLoveSomebody"

Production
 Todd Brodie – engineering assistance
 P. R. Brown – sleeve photography and design
 Nikola Dokic – engineering assistance
 Roger Lian – final digital editing
 Ron Lowe – mix engineering
 John Maschoff – engineering assistance
 Alan Moulder – mixing
 Dave Rieley – engineering assistance
 Paul PDub Walton – recording of Robert Smith's parts
 Howie Weinberg – mastering

Chart position

References

External links
 
The Future Embrace short film

2005 debut albums
Albums produced by Billy Corgan
Billy Corgan albums
Reprise Records albums
Shoegaze albums by American artists
Electronic rock albums by American artists